Danilovsky (masculine), Danilovskaya (feminine), or Danilovskoye (neuter) may refer to:

People
Anna Danilovskaya, Kazakhstani pole vault record holder at the Asian Youth Athletics Championships
Serhiy Danylovskyi (Sergey Danilovsky) (b. 1981), Ukrainian soccer player

Places
Danilovsky District, several districts in Russia
Danilovsky (rural locality) (Danilovskaya, Danilovskoye), several rural localities in Russia
Danilovsky Bridge, a bridge replaced with Avtozavodsky Bridge in Moscow, Russia

Other
Danilovsky (cheese), a Russian cheese

See also
Danilovka, several rural localities in Russia